Stern & Hafferl Verkehr is a transport company operating train, bus and boat services in Upper Austria, Austria. Until December 2009 Stern & Hafferl operated the route from Lambach to Haag, but this line has been closed. They carry 4.7million passengers per year and 150,000 tonnes of freight.

Services
Services offered include:
 LiLo: Linz - Eferding - Neumarkt / Peuerbach
 Attergaubahn: Vöcklamarkt - St.Georgen im Attergau - Attersee
 Vorchdorferbahn: Lambach - Vorchdorf
 Traunseebahn: Vorchdorf - Gmunden
 Gmunder Straßenbahn: Gmunden Tram services
 Atterseeschifffahrt

There are plans to extend the Traunseebahn so that it terminates closer to the centre of Gmunden, at Klosterplatz. From there it might be possible to extend the line further via the town tram system, to Gmunden's ÖBB station. Traunseebahn and Gmunder Straßenbahn were connected at 1.9.2018.

Rolling stock

The company operate a number of locomotives as well as railcars, which often resemble trams.

References

Railway companies of Austria
Economy of Upper Austria